Vivekananda Mission School (VMS) is an English Medium School founded in 1978, according to the ideals of Swami Vivekananda, the founder of the Ramakrishna Mission.The school is affiliated to the Council for the Indian School Certificate Examinations, New Delhi. The School prepares students for ICSE and ISC examinations and for the real outside world. More than 5,000 students are currently studying at the school and the school has more than 20,000 alumni.

The Current Principal Of The School Is Mrs. Sarmistha Banerjee.
The school has an active core committee and governing body.

About VMS
The school was founded in 1978 by C.G. Chandra, an educationist and social worker.

The school is a secular one, which accepts students without regard to race or creed.

The school has three Teacher's Quality Circles and three 5S groups. Every section of each class from V to IX has a Quality Circle to benchmark their standard and goal. The QCs take part in National and International competitions.

The Alumni Association of the school is known as VMS Alumni Association

The school motto is "Knowledge, Courage, Service to Humanity".

History
VMS started with 300 students up to year 6. The children were trained to appear at their board examinations given by the local West Bengal Board of Secondary Education. In 1992 the school received the affiliation to Council for Indian School Certificate Examination which entitled the children to sit for Indian Certificate for Secondary Examination, for year 10, and Indian School Certificate Examination, for year 12).

The 1st ICSE batch of 10 students appeared in 1995 followed by the 1st ISC batch in 1997. At this point, the school had its own building, opposite the Indian Institute of Management Calcutta at Joka.

The school, from year 5 onwards, was shifted to its present address. Within a couple of years another building was annexed to the existing one to accommodate the increasing number of students. Growth began in the shape of science labs, computer labs, library, four halls—the second one is largely used as the audio-visual room, and a play house for the young ones and other facilities.

The school also presently has extended its campus to Pailan Park with a 6 storied building, playground, swimming pool  and a state of the art canteen.

International activities
Winner of The British Council International School Award.

References

External links 
 Official VMS website. 
 Vivekananda Education Society. 
 VMS result on The Telegraph (Kolkata)
 VMS result on The Times of India 
 VMS location 

High schools and secondary schools in West Bengal
Schools in Kolkata
Educational institutions established in 1978
1978 establishments in West Bengal